Carl Henry Jark (June 13, 1905 – March 22, 1984) was a United States Army Lieutenant General, whose final tour of duty before retirement was as the 1962–64 commanding general of IV Corps at Fort Sam Houston, Texas.

Born in Leigh, Nebraska, June 13, 1905, he graduated from high school in Beatrice, followed by enrollment in the United States Military Academy at West Point, New York.

Jark had originally aspired to become a military aircraft pilot, graduating from primary flight training, following his 1929 graduation from West Point.  He instead pursued a career in the US Army's Field Artillery Branch, after an instructor pilot made comment on his size, being very large and heavy for the aircraft of the day. Just prior to the US entry into World War II, he was the Director of Artillery Officer Candidate School, Fort Sill, Oklahoma.  During World War II, he was executive officer of the 63rd Infantry Division artillery, stationed in France and Germany.

During the Korean War, Jark was chief of operations and later deputy assistant chief of staff to the Far East Command.  He was commanding general of the 7th Infantry Division, and later attached to NATO.

As commanding general of IV Corps and Fort Sam Houston, he was also the commanding general of the Strategic Army Corps (STRAC).  His command of STRAC included overall command of multiple divisions and Army Posts, that included (but were not limited to) Fort Polk, Fort Bliss, Fort Chaffee, and Fort Wolters. Upon Jark's 1964 retirement after serving in uniform for 35 years, retirement ceremonies were held for him at Fort Sam Houston. To honor his service, United States Representative from the Texas 20th congressional district Henry B. González read details of Jark's military career into the Congressional Record, closing with:

Retirement ceremonies for Jark were held on base at Fort Sam Houston. Jark died on March 22, 1984, at his home in San Antonio, Texas, and was buried at Fort Sam Houston National Cemetery.

See also
Pershing House

References

1905 births
1984 deaths
Military personnel from Nebraska
People from Colfax County, Nebraska
United States Military Academy alumni
United States Army personnel of World War II